Adeler is a surname. Notable people with the surname include:

 Cort Adeler (1622–1675), Norwegian seaman
 Frederik Adeler (disambiguation), multiple people
 Henrik Adeler (1660–1718), Norwegian civil servant and politician

See also
 Adler (surname)